Richard Sterne (born 27 August 1981) is a South African professional golfer who plays on both the European and Sunshine Tours.

Life and career
Sterne was born in Pretoria and attended St Alban's College for high school. He was runner-up in the Boys' 15–17 Division at the 1999 World Junior Golf Championships and turned pro in 2001. He played on the European Challenge Tour in 2002 and graduated to membership of the main European Tour in 2003. He won his first European Tour title at the 2004 Open de Madrid.

In the 2007 European Tour, Sterne won at the Celtic Manor Wales Open, and finished second at the Johnnie Walker Classic, third at the BMW PGA Championship and fourth at the Barclays Scottish Open, therefore finishing 14th in the Order of Merit. In 2008 he picked up his third victory at the Joburg Open which is co-sanctioned by the Sunshine Tour, and at the end of 2008 won a further two European Tour tournaments in South Africa.

His best year-end ranking on the European Order of Merit is 8th in 2013. His Celtic Manor win moved him into the top 40 of the Official World Golf Ranking for the first time.

He has had six wins on the Sunshine Tour, and won that tour's Order of Merit in 2008. In January 2008 he reached a career high of number 29 in the Official World Golf Ranking. He missed most of the 2010 and 2011 seasons with injury.

In February 2013, Sterne won the Joburg Open by seven strokes, to end a four-year winless drought from which he had been plagued with back injuries. This marked his sixth victory on both the European and Sunshine Tours and came on the back of a second-place finish he had in the previous week at the Dubai Desert Classic. It was also the first event that he had won wire-to-wire. The win moved him inside the top 60, which meant qualification for the WGC-Accenture Match Play Championship and to the top of the Race to Dubai standings. Later he finished second at the Alstom Open de France, ninth at the WGC-Bridgestone Invitational, 13th at the Omega European Masters, and 14th at the DP World Tour Championship, Dubai. As a result, he was eighth in the Race to Dubai final standings.

During the 2014 season, Sterne finished fourth at the WGC-Cadillac Championship, 17th at the WGC-Accenture Match Play Championship and 35th at the PGA Championship. He qualified to the Web.com Tour Finals, where he ended second at the Nationwide Children's Hospital Championship. He finished ninth in the Web.com Tour Finals to earn his PGA Tour card for the 2014–15 season.

Sterne is friends with South African golf icon, Gary Player, to whom he is often compared because of their similar small stature. He has played several times in the Gary Player Invitational charity event to help raise funds for less fortunate children's education.

Amateur wins
1999 South African Junior Strokeplay & Matchplay Championship, South African Amateur
2000 Southern Cross
2001 South African Amateur Strokeplay Championship

Professional wins (9)

European Tour wins (6)

1Co-sanctioned by the Sunshine Tour

European Tour playoff record (2–1)

Sunshine Tour wins (6)

1Co-sanctioned by the European Tour

Sunshine Tour playoff record (3–0)

EuroPro Tour wins (1)
2001 Rye Hill Championship

Playoff record
Web.com Tour playoff record (0–1)

Results in major championships

CUT = missed the half-way cut
WD = withdrew
"T" = tied for place

Summary

Most consecutive cuts made – 3 (twice)
Longest streak of top-10s – 0

Results in The Players Championship

"T" indicates a tie for a place

Results in World Golf Championships
Results not in chronological order before 2015.

QF, R16, R32, R64 = Round in which player lost in match play
"T" = tied
Note that the HSBC Champions did not become a WGC event until 2009.

Team appearances
Professional
World Cup (representing South Africa): 2006, 2008, 2009
Presidents Cup (representing the International team): 2013

See also
2014 Web.com Tour Finals graduates

References

External links

South African male golfers
European Tour golfers
Sunshine Tour golfers
PGA Tour golfers
Korn Ferry Tour graduates
White South African people
Sportspeople from Pretoria
Sportspeople from Manchester
1981 births
Living people